Muzaffer Tema (June 15, 1919 – October 4, 2011) was a Turkish movie actor.

He was born on June 15, 1919 in Istanbul. Following his education in flute, violin and piano playing at the Istanbul Municipality Conservatory, he served as a musician at the Ankara State Conservatory and the Presidency Philharmonic Orchestra.

In 1949, Muzaffer debuted in acting in the movie Çığlık. He became popular in the Turkish cinema during the 1950s. To try his luck in Hollywood, he divorced and went in 1956 to the USA, where he played in two movies, A Certain Smile (1958) (Acı Tebessüm) and Twelve to the Moon (1960) (Aya Giden 12 Adam). He was also married to Zisan Tema and  became so the first ever Turkish actor to play in a Hollywood movie. After two and half years, he returned home due to his father's illness.

He died in the morning of October 4, 2011 at the age of 92 in Çeşme, İzmir Province, where he lived since 1999 with his wife İnci.

Selected filmography

References

External links 

Muzaffer Tema at Sinema Türk

1919 births
Male actors from Istanbul
Turkish male film actors
Turkish film producers
2011 deaths